The FilBasket Subic Championship, also known as the FilBasket Subic Championship – Cocolife due to sponsorship reasons, was the first season of FilBasket starting in October 2021 starting from October 28, 2021, to November 21, 2021. The venue for all of the games was the Subic Bay Gymnasium.

Format 
The format of the season were:

 Single round robin (11 teams, 55 games total)
 Quarterfinals (Top 4 teams will have a twice-to-beat advantage)
 Semifinals (Knockout Game)
 Finals (Best-of-Three)

Elimination round

Team standings

Results

Playoff bracket

Quarterfinals

AICC vs MTrans

Pasig vs Nueva Ecija

Davao Occidental vs EOG Sports

San Juan vs Medical Depot

Semifinals

AICC vs Pasig

San Juan vs Davao Occidental

Finals

Game One

Game Two

Game Three 

Hesed Gabo is the Finals MVP of the tournament.

Leaders

Professional status
The status of FilBasket—whether it is considered as a professional or an amateur league under government regulations—has been a point of contention. The league organizers, while admitting long-term plans to turn professional, insist that it is an amateur league. FilBasket secured approval from SBMA and the IATF for a bubble tournament at the Subic Bay Gymnasium, in accordance with regulations for amateur leagues.

The Games and Amusements Board (GAB) of the Philippine government contends that FilBasket is a professional league and hence falls under its jurisdiction. With the dispute supposedly resolved in October 2021, FilBasket pushed through with its first tournament, the FilBasket Subic Championship.

In November 2021, after the tournament concluded, the GAB issued a cease and desist order against FilBasket which the government agency declared as unlawful. GAB imposed no further sanction but warned it would pursue action if FilBasket does not comply with regulations on profssional leagues and holds a similar tournament. On January 19, the GAB declared it would not pursue legal action but noted that it will continue to monitor the league.

References 

2020–21 in Philippine basketball leagues
Sports scandals in the Philippines
2021 subic